The 1978 Sri Lanka Cyclone (JTWC designation: 04B) was one of the most destructive tropical cyclones to strike Sri Lanka since modern records began. The cyclone formed on November 17, 1978, and attained peak intensity on November 23, 1978, right before making landfall in Batticaloa. Sri Lanka's eastern province was heavily affected by the cyclone.

Meteorological history 

The storm formed on 17 November over the southwest Bay of Bengal. It intensified gradually, reaching a peak intensity of 220 kmph (140 mph), while the Joint Typhoon Warning Center analyzed the storm as a Category 2 equivalent cyclone on the Saffir–Simpson scale on November 23. The cyclone made landfall in Batticaloa at its peak intensity by the same night. It emerged over the Gulf of Mannar on the 24th. That same evening, the storm made its second landfall in Kilakkarai in Tamil Nadu with one-minute sustained winds of 85 kmph (50 mph). The storm then moved back into the ocean around the Kerala coast. It spent its remaining days over Arabian Sea, eventually dissipating on 29 November.

Impact 
The cyclone had devastating impacts in Sri Lanka, killing about 915 people. An estimated more than one million people were affected, with over 250,000 buildings damaged, and one fifth of Batticaloa's fishing fleet destroyed. 9 of the 11 paddy stores were destroyed and 90 percent of the coconut plantation (28,000 odd acres of coconut plantation) in the Batticaloa district had been destroyed. The Sri Lankan government spent over 600 million Sri Lankan rupees in relief efforts in the aftermath of the disaster. A tropical cyclone report noted that over 130 electrical lines were downed and many of religious buildings were reduced to rubble. The cyclone resulted in a substantial number of people being left without electricity and water. Many houses suffered severe structural damage due to its high wind speeds.

The impact of the storm in India was minimal. The storm brought some damage to the province of Nadu. In the Ramanathapuram and Tuticorin districts nearly 5000 huts were damaged, and damages in Indian Rupees were estimated to be 5 crores ($626.8 1978 USD). The storm brought rainfall over Kerala and the Lakshadweep Islands.

References

External links 
 12 மணி நேரம் (The 12 hours), a Tamil book has been documented the 1978 cyclone and its aftermath.

Tropical cyclones in Sri Lanka
1978 in Sri Lanka
1978–79 Southern Hemisphere tropical cyclone season